The National Olympic Committee of the Republic of Kazakhstan (Qazaqstan Respublikasy Ūlttyq Olimpiadalyq komitetı; ; IOC code: KAZ) is the National Olympic Committee representing Kazakhstan. It is a member of the Olympic Council of Asia.

List of presidents

Member federations
The Kazakhstan National Federations are the organizations that coordinate all aspects of their individual sports. They are responsible for training, competition and development of their sports. There are currently 29 Olympic Summer and 6 Winter Sport Federations in Kazakhstan.

See also
 Kazakhstan at the Olympics

External links
 Official website

Kazakhstan
Sports governing bodies in Kazakhstan
Kazakhstan at the Olympics
1990 establishments in the Kazakh Soviet Socialist Republic
Sports organizations established in 1990